Sarah Basem Najem Abu-Sabbah (born 27 October 1999) is a German-born Jordanian footballer who plays for SV Meppen in Germany's Frauen-Bundesliga. She has also played for the Jordan under-17 team that played in the 2016 FIFA U-17 World Cup and the senior national team of Jordan.

Early life
Abu-Sabbah was born on October 27, 1999 in Düsseldorf, Germany. Her father migrated to Germany in 1994. She started playing football at age 4 with her mother registering her at a boys' football club.

Youth career
Abu-Sabbah played for the youth teams of SGS Essen and Bayer Leverkusen at the U17 Bundesliga South/SouthWest division in the 2014–15 and 2015-16 season respectively.

Club career
On March 20, 2016 she made her first appearance for the senior team of Bayer Leverkusen at the Frauen-Bundesliga, becoming the first female Jordanian to play in a league outside Jordan and the first Arab to play in the German women's league. She only played in one match. In 2017, she is playing for Bayer Leverkusen II of third-tier league Regionalliga West.

International career
Abu-Sabbah first joined the Jordan U-17 team in 2015. At the 2016 FIFA U-17 World Cup which was hosted in Jordan, she debuted for the under-17 team of Jordan in the match against Spain. She later scored the first goal of the Jordan U-17 team in the tournament in their 1-4 loss to Mexico.

She debuted for the senior team in September 2017 in the 2-1 friendly win against Latvia in Riga. She was among the players that represented Jordan at the 2018 AFC Women's Asian Cup.

International goals
Scores and results list Jordan's goal tally first.

References

External links
 

1999 births
Living people
Women's association football midfielders
Jordanian women's footballers
Jordan women's international footballers
German women's footballers
Footballers from Düsseldorf
German people of Jordanian descent
Bayer 04 Leverkusen (women) players
SGS Essen players

Association football midfielders